Our Lady of Perpetual Help Parish - designated for Polish immigrants in Quaker Hill, Connecticut, United States.

Founded in 1904, it is one of the Polish-American Roman Catholic parishes in New England in the Diocese of Norwich. Originally located in New London, the congregation built their first church on Huntington Street in that city in 1915, designed by New London architect James Sweeney. The building was designed in the Gothic Revival style. When planned expansion of Interstate 95 threatened the church building in the 1970s, the congregation moved to their current building in Quaker Hill in 1973.

Bibliography 

 
 
 
 The Official Catholic Directory in USA

External links 
 Our Lady of Perpetual Help - Diocesan information 
 Our Lady of Perpetual Help - ParishesOnline.com
 Diocese of Norwich

Roman Catholic parishes of Diocese of Norwich
Polish-American Roman Catholic parishes in Connecticut
Buildings and structures in Waterford, Connecticut
Churches in New London County, Connecticut